The 2021–22 season was the 78th season in the existence of Lille OSC and the club's 22nd consecutive season in the top flight of French football. In addition to the domestic league, Lille participated in this season's editions of the Coupe de France, the Trophée des Champions, and the UEFA Champions League.

Players

First-team squad

Other players under contract

Out on loan

Transfers

In

Out

Pre-season and friendlies

Competitions

Overall record

Ligue 1

League table

Results summary

Results by round

Matches
The league fixtures were announced on 25 June 2021.

Coupe de France

Trophée des Champions

UEFA Champions League

Group stage

The draw for the group stage was held on 26 August 2021.

Knockout phase

Round of 16
The draw for the round of 16 was held on 13 December 2021.

Statistics

Appearances and goals

|-
! colspan=14 style=background:#dcdcdc; text-align:center| Goalkeepers

|-
! colspan=14 style=background:#dcdcdc; text-align:center| Defenders

|-
! colspan=14 style=background:#dcdcdc; text-align:center| Midfielders

|-
! colspan=14 style=background:#dcdcdc; text-align:center| Forwards

|-
! colspan=14 style=background:#dcdcdc; text-align:center| Players transferred out during the season

Goalscorers

References

Lille OSC seasons
Lille
Lille